Orcuttia californica is a rare species of grass known by the common name California Orcutt grass.

Distribution
It is native to southern California and northern Baja California, where it grows in scattered locations in vernal pool habitat. In 1993 it was known from fewer than 20 occurrences, including those at the Santa Rosa Plateau, a creek drainage near Hemet, Otay Mesa in San Diego County, and one spot in Woodland Hills.

Orcuttia californica is a federally listed endangered species, and its existence is still threatened by the disappearance of vernal pools in the region, a naturally rare habitat type that has been reduced further by urban development.

Description
Orcuttia californica is a small, hairy annual grass with prostrate stems sometimes forming small tufts or mats, rarely exceeding 15 centimeters tall. It is bright green, aromatic, and glandular, secreting sticky, bitter-tasting exudate. The leaves are 1 or 2 centimeters long, the first set produced when the pool is wet, another set growing during the dry season. The inflorescence is up to 6 centimeters long with red-maroon to pink anthers extending out from the terminal spikelets.

References

External links
Jepson Manual Treatment - Orcuttia californica
Grass Manual Treatment - Orcuttia californica
Images of the Santa Rosa Plateau by Wayne Armstrong
Orcuttia californica - Photo gallery

californica
Native grasses of California
Bunchgrasses of North America
Flora of Baja California
Natural history of the California chaparral and woodlands
Natural history of the Channel Islands of California
Natural history of the Peninsular Ranges
Natural history of the Santa Monica Mountains
Natural history of the Transverse Ranges